Gorica pri Slivnici is a village, and one of the most populous settlements in the Municipality of Šentjur, in eastern Slovenia. The settlement, and the municipality, are included in the Savinja Statistical Region, which is in the Slovenian portion of the historical Duchy of Styria.

Name
The name of the settlement was changed from Gorica to Gorica pri Slivnici in 1953.

Church

The local church is dedicated to Saint Urban and belongs to the Parish of Slivnica pri Celju. It dates to the early 17th century and was consecrated in 1621. In the 19th century it was partially rebuilt and vaulted.

References

External links
Gorica pri Slivnici at Geopedia

Populated places in the Municipality of Šentjur